Calamagrostis epigejos, common names wood small-reed or bushgrass, is a species of grass in the family Poaceae which is native to Eurasia and Africa. It is found from average moisture locales to salt marsh and wet habitats.

Description 
The foliage is a medium green and is perennial with lengthy rhizomes. The glumes are scaberulous and lanceolate while the lemma is only a half of its length.

The large inflorescence is a rich brown colour.

Distribution 
Calamagrostis epigejos has a broad distribution in temperate Eurasia, from France and Great Britain to Japan. A distinct variety is found in southern and eastern Africa.

Cultivation 
Calamagrostis epigejos is cultivated as an ornamental grass for gardens.

References

External links 

Bluestem.ca: Calamagrostis epigejos
Gobotany.nativeplanttrust.org: Calamagrostis epigejos (feathertop reed grass)

epigejos
Grasses of Africa
Grasses of Asia
Grasses of Europe
Garden plants of Africa
Garden plants of Asia
Garden plants of Europe
Plants described in 1753
Taxa named by Carl Linnaeus